Roar is a 2014 Indian Hindi-language film written and directed by Kamal Sadanah. The film was premiered by Salman Khan at an event in Mumbai on 31 July 2014, ahead of a 31 October release. It is an epic tale of a team trying to outsmart the acute senses of the infamous white tiger who is looking for her cub.

Cast

Abhinav Shukla as Pundit
Himarsha Venkatsamy as Jhumpa
Achint Kaur as Forest Warden
Subrat Dutta as Bheera
Nora Fatehi as CJ
Ali Quli Mirza as Hero
Aadil Chahal as Kashmiri
Varinder Singh Ghuman as Cheena
Aaran Chaudhary as Sufi
Pranay Dixit as  Madhu
Pulkit Jawahar as Uday

Production

Roar was shot in the dense mangrove forest, showcasing the animal-man conflict, and the film has aerial visuals of the Sundarbans and over 800 shots with special effects. Director Kamal Sadanah said, "We spent four months doing the test shoots and we shot with trained tigers from Los Angeles and Thailand and composited these sequences with the ones taken at Sundarbans with VFX". He concluded by saying that he had to take up an online course in visual effects along with his producer Abis Rizvi.

Crew

LA-based Michael Watson, whose resume has The Curious Case of Benjamin Button, was hired as the director of photography, and a special team from Scandinavia was signed to film the aerial shots using helicams. Producer Rizvi said, "With an international crew of 150 on board and a 300-member VFX team, it took us 12 months to edit the film and put our audacious dream out on celluloid. Academy Award winner Resul Pookutty was signed for Sound design."

Reviews

Roar gathered mixed reviews. Hindustan Times mentioned it as, Novelty of the concept makes it an interesting film and appreciated its editing and computer graphics and said the film would show you something that you didn't even know existed in India, concluding it as a smartly executed film which deserves attention. While ABPLIVE criticised it as a film only for brain dead. Subhash K Jha wrote that, Roar is a visual swagger and splendour with stunning shots of the natural beauty of the Sunderbans, if you're the sort who grants leeway to movies for stretching its neck out beyond the domain of the conventional. He observed its photography as 'brilliant'.  Rediff gave 2 and a half stars and mentioned Roar would not disappoint you and the film's strengths are the novelty of the concept, and the judicious use of Computer Graphics. Filmfare mentioned it as entertaining, shot like a Hollywood film which has some genuinely great Computer Graphics. It also wrote that the camera work is at par with any big-budget Hollywood film, and the cinematography showcases the flora and fauna of the Sundarbans on a grand scale, and the special effects are superlative. Movie talkies gave it 3 stars saying Technical brilliance and the film's stage & setting – This is what makes Roar stand out from the crowd in a major way.

Box office

As per Box Office India, Roar collected 15 million on its first day of release, and a total of 4.75–5.0 million net as weekend collection. While movieglamour website reported that Roar is doing moderate business and collected 70.0 million from its first 4 days, Bollywood Hungama reported that Roar collected 83.8 million at the end of its 1st week run.

See also 

 Tiger attacks
 Tiger attacks in the Sundarbans
 Champawat Tiger
 Thak man-eater

References

External links 
 
 

2014 films
Indian adventure thriller films
Sundarbans
2010s Hindi-language films
Films set in West Bengal
2010s adventure thriller films
Films about tigers
Films about hunters
Tigers in India